Jani Šturm (born 20 March 1982) is a former Slovenian footballer who played as a forward.

Career
Šturm began his career with his hometown Brda. In 1999, he was scouted by Gorica, where he started his professional career in the Slovenian PrvaLiga in 2001. In summer 2005, Šturm was due to sign for Leicester City, but the move fell through after he failed a medical on his long-standing groin injury.

In July 2007, Šturm began a two-week trial with Dundee United before beginning a trial spell with Greenock Morton.

On 1 August 2007, he signed for Dundee in a one-year deal with the option of a second year, rejecting apparent interest from Morton, St Johnstone, Gretna and Dunfermline Athletic. Šturm scored his only league goal for the club in a 2–1 victory against his former team Morton. He was released from the club on 31 May 2008, after scoring only two goals in his time at the Dens Park.

In August 2008, Šturm returned home to Slovenia, where he signed a two-year contract to play for Domžale.

Šturm scored his first league goal for Domžale with the game's opener against the previous season's fourth placed side, Celje, in a 3–2 away victory. He was released by Domžale in August 2010, and signed for Drava Ptuj in January 2011, where he stayed for eight months before resigning for his first club in the Third Division, Brda.

References

External links
Jani Šturm at NZS 

1982 births
Living people
People from the Municipality of Brda
Slovenian footballers
Association football forwards
Slovenian Second League players
Slovenian PrvaLiga players
Scottish Football League players
ND Gorica players
Dundee F.C. players
NK Domžale players
NK Drava Ptuj players
NK Brda players
FC Koper players
Slovenian expatriate footballers
Slovenian expatriate sportspeople in Scotland
Expatriate footballers in Scotland
Slovenian expatriate sportspeople in Italy
Expatriate footballers in Italy
Slovenian football managers
Slovenian expatriate football managers
Expatriate football managers in Italy